List of fungus species in the genus Aspergillus.

Species
The genus Aspergillus includes several hundred fungus species. There are 817 records as accepted by Species Fungorum in (Feb 2023) although this list also includes synonyms as well; In the list below, if no author/authors (or published date) mentioned then it is not listed in Species Fungorum.

A

Aspergillus acidohumus  
Aspergillus acidus 
Aspergillus acolumnaris 
Aspergillus acrensis 
Aspergillus aculeatinus 
Aspergillus aculeatus 
Aspergillus acutus 
Aspergillus aeneus  
Aspergillus aerius 
Aspergillus affinis 
Aspergillus aflatoxiformans 
Aspergillus agricola 
Aspergillus alabamensis 
Aspergillus albertensis 
Aspergillus alboluteus 
Aspergillus alboviridis 
Aspergillus allahabadii 
Aspergillus alliaceus 
Aspergillus allocotus 
Aspergillus alutaceus 
Aspergillus amazonensis   
[[Aspergillus ambiguusSappa (1955)}}Aspergillus amethystinus Aspergillus amoenus Aspergillus amstelodami Aspergillus amyloliquefaciens Aspergillus amylovorus Aspergillus angustatus Aspergillus anomalus Aspergillus anthodesmis Aspergillus angustatus  Aspergillus apicalis Aspergillus appendiculatus Aspergillus arachidicola Aspergillus arcoverdensis Aspergillus ardalensis  Aspergillus arenarioides Aspergillus arenarius Aspergillus argenteus Aspergillus aridicola Aspergillus arizonicus Aspergillus arxii Aspergillus asclerogenus Aspergillus askiburgiensis Aspergillus aspearensis Aspergillus asper Aspergillus asperescens Aspergillus assiutensis Aspergillus assulatus Aspergillus astellatus Aspergillus aurantiobrunneus Aspergillus aurantiopurpureus Aspergillus atacamensis Aspergillus atheciellus Aspergillus athecius Aspergillus attinii Aspergillus aurantiacoflavus Aspergillus aurantiobrunneus Aspergillus aurantiopurpureus Aspergillus auratus Aspergillus aureofulgens Aspergillus aureolatus Aspergillus aureolus Aspergillus aureoluteus Aspergillus aureoterreus Aspergillus aureus Aspergillus auricomus Aspergillus australensis Aspergillus austroafricanus  Aspergillus austwickii Aspergillus avenaceus Aspergillus awamori 

BAspergillus baarnensis  Aspergillus baeticus Aspergillus bahamensis Aspergillus banksianus Aspergillus barbosae Aspergillus batatas Aspergillus beijingensis Aspergillus bertholletius  Aspergillus bezerrae Aspergillus bicephalus Aspergillus bicolor Aspergillus biplanus Aspergillus bisporus Aspergillus bombycis Aspergillus botswanensis Aspergillus botucatensis Aspergillus brasiliensis  Aspergillus brevijanus Aspergillus brevipes Aspergillus brevistipitatus Aspergillus bridgeri Aspergillus brunneo-uniseriatus  Aspergillus brunneusAspergillus brunneoviolaceus Aspergillus burnettii 

CAspergillus caatingaensis  Aspergillus caelatus   Aspergillus caesiellus Aspergillus caespitosus Aspergillus calidoustus  Aspergillus californicus Aspergillus campestris Aspergillus canadensis Aspergillus candidus Aspergillus caninus Aspergillus capensis Aspergillus caperatus Aspergillus capsici Aspergillus carbonarius >Aspergillus carlsbadensis Aspergillus carneus Aspergillus carlsbadensis   Aspergillus cavernicola  Aspergillus cejpii  Aspergillus cellulosae Aspergillus cerealis Aspergillus cervinus   Aspergillus chaetosartoryae Aspergillus chevalieri Aspergillus chinensis     Aspergillus chlamydosporus Aspergillus christenseniae Aspergillus chryseides Aspergillus chrysellus Aspergillus chungii  Aspergillus cibarius Aspergillus citocrescens Aspergillus citrinoterreus Aspergillus citrisporus Aspergillus clavatoflavus  Aspergillus clavatonanicus Aspergillus clavatophorus Aspergillus clavatus Aspergillus cleistominutus Aspergillus collembolorum Aspergillus collinsii Aspergillus coloradensis Aspergillus compatibilis Aspergillus conicus Aspergillus conjunctus Aspergillus contaminans Aspergillus conversis  Aspergillus coreanus Aspergillus coremiiformis Aspergillus corolligenus Aspergillus corrugatus Aspergillus costaricensis Aspergillus costiformis Aspergillus crassihyphae Aspergillus creber Aspergillus cremeoflavus Aspergillus cremeus Aspergillus cretensis Aspergillus cristatellus Aspergillus cristatus Aspergillus croceiaffinis Aspergillus croceus Aspergillus crustosus Aspergillus crystallinus Aspergillus cumulatus Aspergillus curvatus Aspergillus curviformis Aspergillus cvjetkovicii 

D
 Aspergillus deflectus Aspergillus delacroixiiAspergillus delicatus Aspergillus densusAspergillus dentatulus Aspergillus denticulatus Aspergillus depauperatus  Aspergillus desertorum Aspergillus dessyiAspergillus destruens Aspergillus digitatusAspergillus dimorphicus Aspergillus diplocystisAspergillus dipodomyus Aspergillus discophorus Aspergillus disjunctusAspergillus desertorumAspergillus diversus Aspergillus dobrogensis Aspergillus domesticus Aspergillus dorothicusAspergillus dromiae Aspergillus dubius Aspergillus duricaulisAspergillus dybowskii 

EAspergillus eburneocremeus Aspergillus eburneusAspergillus echinosporusAspergillus echinulatus Aspergillus ecuadorensisAspergillus effususAspergillus egyptiacus Aspergillus elatiorAspergillus elegans Aspergillus ellipsoideus Aspergillus ellipticus Aspergillus elongatus Aspergillus elsenburgensis Aspergillus endophyticus Aspergillus equitis Aspergillus erythrocephalus Aspergillus eucalypticola Aspergillus europaeus 

FAspergillus falconensis Aspergillus fasciculatus Aspergillus felis Aspergillus fennelliae Aspergillus ferenczii Aspergillus ferrugineus Aspergillus ficuum Aspergillus fiemonthi Aspergillus fijiensis Aspergillus filifer Aspergillus fimetarius Aspergillus fimeti Aspergillus fimicola Aspergillus fischeri Aspergillus fischerianus Aspergillus flaschentraegeri Aspergillus flavescens Aspergillus flavidus Aspergillus flavipes Aspergillus flavofurcatus Aspergillus flavoviridescensAspergillus flavus Aspergillus floccosus Aspergillus flocculosus Aspergillus floridensis Aspergillus floriformis Aspergillus foeniculicola Aspergillus foetidus Aspergillus fonsecaeus Aspergillus foutoynontii Aspergillus foveolatus Aspergillus frankstonensis Aspergillus frequens Aspergillus fresenii Aspergillus fructus  Aspergillus fruticans  Aspergillus fruticulosus Aspergillus fujiokensis Aspergillus fuliginosus Aspergillus fulvus Aspergillus fumaricus Aspergillus fumigatiaffinis Aspergillus fumigatoides Aspergillus fumigatus Aspergillus fumisynnematus Aspergillus fungoidesAspergillus funiculosus Aspergillus fuscicans Aspergillus fuscusGAspergillus gaarensis Aspergillus galapagensis Aspergillus galeritusAspergillus germanicus Aspergillus giganteus Aspergillus gigantosulphureusAspergillus gigasAspergillus glaber Aspergillus glabripes Aspergillus glaucoaffinis Aspergillus glauconiveus Aspergillus glaucus Aspergillus globosusAspergillus godfriniAspergillus gorakhpurensis Aspergillus gracilis Aspergillus granulatus Aspergillus granulosus Aspergillus gratiotiAspergillus greconisAspergillus griseoaurantiacus Aspergillus griseus Aspergillus guttiferAspergillus gymnosardae 

HAspergillus hainanicus Aspergillus haitiensis Aspergillus halophilicusAspergillus halophilusAspergillus hancockii Aspergillus heldtiae Aspergillus helicothrix Aspergillus hennebergii Aspergillus herbariorum Aspergillus heterocaryoticus Aspergillus heteromorphus Aspergillus heterothallicusAspergillus heyangensis Aspergillus hiratsukae Aspergillus haitiensisAspergillus hollandicus  Aspergillus homomorphus Aspergillus  Aspergillus hordei Aspergillus hortaeAspergillus hortaiAspergillus huiyaniae Aspergillus humicola Aspergillus humusAspergillus hydei 

IAspergillus ibericus Aspergillus igneus Aspergillus iizukae Aspergillus implicatus Aspergillus incahuasiensis Aspergillus incrassatus Aspergillus indicusAspergillus indohii Aspergillus indologenus Aspergillus inflatus Aspergillus infrequens Aspergillus ingratus Aspergillus insecticola Aspergillus insolitus Aspergillus insuetus Aspergillus insulicola Aspergillus intermedius Aspergillus inuii Aspergillus inusitatus Aspergillus iranicus Aspergillus israelensis Aspergillus itaconicus Aspergillus ivoriensis 

JAspergillus jaipurensis Aspergillus janus Aspergillus japonicus Aspergillus jeanselmei Aspergillus jensenii Aspergillus jilinensis 

KAspergillus kalimae Aspergillus kambarensis Aspergillus kanagawaensis Aspergillus karnatakaensis Aspergillus kassunensis Aspergillus keratitidis Aspergillus katsuobushiAspergillus keveii Aspergillus keveioides Aspergillus koningii Aspergillus koreanus Aspergillus krugeri Aspergillus kumbius 

LAspergillus labruscus Aspergillus laciniosus Aspergillus lacticoffeatus Aspergillus lannaensis Aspergillus laneus Aspergillus lanosus Aspergillus lanuginosus Aspergillus laokiashanensis Aspergillus lateralis Aspergillus latilabiatus Aspergillus latus Aspergillus lentulus Aspergillus lepidophytonAspergillus leporis Aspergillus leucocarpus  Aspergillus levisporus Aspergillus lignieresii Aspergillus limoniformis Aspergillus longistipitatus Aspergillus longivesica Aspergillus longobasidia Aspergillus loretoensis Aspergillus luchensi Aspergillus luchuensis Aspergillus lucknowensis Aspergillus luppii Aspergillus luteonigerAspergillus luteorubrus Aspergillus luteovirescensAspergillus lutescensAspergillus luteusMAspergillus macfieiAspergillus macrosporusAspergillus magaliesburgensis Aspergillus magnivesiculatus Aspergillus malignus Aspergillus mallochii Aspergillus malodoratusAspergillus malvaceusAspergillus malvicolor Aspergillus mandshuricus Aspergillus mangaliensis  Aspergillus manginii Aspergillus mannitosusAspergillus maritimus Aspergillus marvanovae Aspergillus mattletiiAspergillus maximusAspergillus medius Aspergillus megasporus Aspergillus melitensisAspergillus melleus Aspergillus mellinus Aspergillus mencieriAspergillus micheliiAspergillus microcephalus  Aspergillus microcysticus Aspergillus micronesiensis Aspergillus microperforatus Aspergillus microsporusAspergillus microthecius Aspergillus microviridicitrinus  Aspergillus minimus Aspergillus minisclerotigenes Aspergillus minorAspergillus minutusAspergillus miraensis Aspergillus miyajii Aspergillus miyakoensisAspergillus mollisAspergillus monodii Aspergillus montenegroi Aspergillus montevidensis Aspergillus montoensis Aspergillus mottae Aspergillus movilensis Aspergillus mucoroidesAspergillus mucoroideusAspergillus muelleriAspergillus multicolor Aspergillus multiplicatus Aspergillus muricatus Aspergillus muscivoraAspergillus mutabilis  Aspergillus mycetomi-villabruzziiAspergillus mycobancheNAspergillus nakazawae {{Au|Sakag., Iizuka & M. Yamaz. (1950)Aspergillus nanangensis Aspergillus nantae Aspergillus nanusAspergillus navahoensis Aspergillus neoafricanus Aspergillus neoalliaceus Aspergillus neoauricomusAspergillus neobridgeri  Aspergillus neocarnoyi Aspergillus neoechinulatusAspergillus neoellipticus Aspergillus neoflavipes Aspergillus neoglaber Aspergillus neoindicus  Aspergillus neoniger   Aspergillus neoniveus  Aspergillus neoterreus Aspergillus nidulans Aspergillus nidulellusAspergillus niger Aspergillus nigrescensAspergillus nigricansAspergillus nishimurae Aspergillus niveoglaucus Aspergillus niveusAspergillus noeltingAspergillus nomiae Aspergillus nominusAspergillus nomiusAspergillus noonimiae Aspergillus novofumigatus Aspergillus novoguineensis Aspergillus novoparasiticus Aspergillus novofumigatusAspergillus novusAspergillus nutans 

OAspergillus occultus    Aspergillus ochraceopetaliformis Aspergillus ochraceoroseus  Aspergillus ochraceoruberAspergillus ochraceus Aspergillus oerlinghausenensis  Aspergillus okavangoensis Aspergillus okazakiiAspergillus oleicola Aspergillus olivaceofuscusAspergillus olivaceusAspergillus olivascensAspergillus olivicolaAspergillus olivimuriae Aspergillus omanensis Aspergillus onikiiAspergillus oosporusAspergillus ornatulus Aspergillus ornatusAspergillus oryzaeAspergillus osmophilus  Aspergillus ostianus  Aspergillus otanii Aspergillus ovalispermusAspergillus oxumiae 

PAspergillus pachycaulis Aspergillus pachycristatus Aspergillus paleaceus Aspergillus pallidofulvus Aspergillus pallidus Aspergillus panamensis Aspergillus papuensis   Aspergillus paradoxusAspergillus parafelis  Aspergillus parasiticus Aspergillus parrulusAspergillus parvathecius Aspergillus parvisclerotigenusAspergillus parviverruculosus Aspergillus parvulus Aspergillus paulistensi Aspergillus penicillatusAspergillus penicilliformis Aspergillus penicillioides Aspergillus penicillioideumAspergillus penicillopsisAspergillus pepii Aspergillus periconioides Aspergillus pernambucoensis Aspergillus perniciosusAspergillus persii Aspergillus petersonii  Aspergillus petrakii Aspergillus peyronelii Aspergillus phaeocephalusAspergillus phialiformis Aspergillus phialiseptatus Aspergillus phialosimplex Aspergillus phoenicisAspergillus pidoplichknovii Aspergillus pipericola Aspergillus piperis  Aspergillus pisciAspergillus pluriseminatus  Aspergillus polychromusAspergillus polyporicola Aspergillus porosus Aspergillus porphyreostipitatus Aspergillus posadasensis Aspergillus pouchetiiAspergillus pragensis Aspergillus primulinus Aspergillus profususAspergillus proliferans Aspergillus protuberus Aspergillus posadasensis  Aspergillus pragensis Aspergillus pseudocaelatus Aspergillus pseudocarbonarius Aspergillus pseudocitricusAspergillus pseudoclavatusAspergillus pseudodeflectus Aspergillus pseudoelatiorAspergillus pseudoelegans Aspergillus pseudofelis Aspergillus pseudoflavusAspergillus pseudoglaucus Aspergillus pseudogracilis Aspergillus pseudoheteromorphusAspergillus pseudonigerAspergillus pseudonomiae Aspergillus pseudosclerotiorum Aspergillus pseudotamarii Aspergillus pseudoterreus Aspergillus pseudoustus Aspergillus pseudoviridinutans Aspergillus pulchellusAspergillus pulmonum-hominisAspergillus pulvericola Aspergillus pulverulentus Aspergillus pulvinus Aspergillus puniceus Aspergillus purpureocrustaceus Aspergillus purpureofuscus Aspergillus purpureus Aspergillus pusillusAspergillus puulaauensis Aspergillus pyramidusAspergillus pyriQAspergillus qilianyuensis Aspergillus qinqixianii Aspergillus qizutongii Aspergillus quadricinctus Aspergillus quadricingens Aspergillus quadrifidusAspergillus quadrilineatus Aspergillus quercinusAspergillus quininaeAspergillus quitensisRAspergillus racemosusAspergillus raianus Aspergillus rambellii Aspergillus raperi Aspergillus ramosusAspergillus raperiAspergillus recurvatusAspergillus recifensis Aspergillus recurvatus Aspergillus rehmii Aspergillus repandusAspergillus repens Aspergillus reptansAspergillus restrictus Aspergillus reticulatus Aspergillus rhizopodus Aspergillus robustus Aspergillus roseoglobosusAspergillus roseoglobulosus Aspergillus roseovelutinus Aspergillus roseus Aspergillus ruber Aspergillus rubrobrunneus Aspergillus rubrumAspergillus rufescensAspergillus rugulosus Aspergillus rugulovalvus Aspergillus rutilansSAspergillus sacchariAspergillus saccharolyticus Aspergillus saitoi  Aspergillus salinarum Aspergillus salinicola Aspergillus salisburgensis Aspergillus salviicola Aspergillus salwaensis Aspergillus salviicolaAspergillus sartoryiAspergillus savannensis Aspergillus scheeleiAspergillus schiemanniaeAspergillus sclerogenus Aspergillus sclerotialis Aspergillus sclerotiicarbonarius Aspergillus sclerotioniger Aspergillus sclerotiorum Aspergillus seifertii Aspergillus sejunctusAspergillus septatusAspergillus sepultus Aspergillus sergii Aspergillus serratalhadensis Aspergillus sesamicola Aspergillus shendaweii Aspergillus siamensis Aspergillus sigurros Aspergillus silvaticus Aspergillus similanensis Aspergillus similis  Aspergillus simplexAspergillus sloanii Aspergillus sojae Aspergillus solicola Aspergillus sparsus Aspergillus spathulatus Aspergillus spectabilis Aspergillus spelaeus Aspergillus spelunceus Aspergillus spiculosus Aspergillus spinosus Aspergillus spinulosporus Aspergillus spinulosus Aspergillus spiralisAspergillus stella-maris Aspergillus stellatus Aspergillus stellifer Aspergillus stelliformis Aspergillus stercorarius Aspergillus sterigmatophorusAspergillus steynii Aspergillus stramenius Aspergillus striatulus Aspergillus striatus Aspergillus stromatoides Aspergillus strychni Aspergillus subalbidus Aspergillus subflavus Aspergillus subfuscusAspergillus subgriseusAspergillus sublatus Aspergillus sublevisporus Aspergillus subnutans Aspergillus subolivaceus Aspergillus subramanianii Aspergillus subsessilis Aspergillus subunguis Aspergillus subversicolor Aspergillus sulphureoviridis Aspergillus sulphureusAspergillus sunderbaniiAspergillus suttoniae Aspergillus sydowii Aspergillus sylvaticusAspergillus syncephalisTAspergillus tabacinus Aspergillus taichungensis Aspergillus takadae Aspergillus takakii Aspergillus taklimakanensis Aspergillus tamarii Aspergillus tamarindosoli Aspergillus tanneri   Aspergillus tapirirae  Aspergillus tardicrescens Aspergillus tardus Aspergillus tasmanicus Aspergillus tatenoi Aspergillus telluris Aspergillus templicola   Aspergillus tennesseensis Aspergillus teporis Aspergillus terrestrisAspergillus terreus Aspergillus terricola Aspergillus testaceocolorans Aspergillus tetrazonusAspergillus texensis Aspergillus thailandensis Aspergillus thermomutatusAspergillus thesauricus Aspergillus thomi Aspergillus tiraboschiiAspergillus togoensis Aspergillus tokelauAspergillus tonophilus  Aspergillus toxicariusAspergillus toxicus Aspergillus transcarpathicus Aspergillus transmontanensis Aspergillus trinidadensis Aspergillus trisporus Aspergillus tritici Aspergillus tsunodae Aspergillus tsurutae Aspergillus tuberculatus Aspergillus tubingensis Aspergillus tumidus Aspergillus tunetanusAspergillus turcosus Aspergillus turkensis 

UAspergillus udagawae Aspergillus umbrinusAspergillus umbrosus Aspergillus undulatus Aspergillus unguis Aspergillus unilateralis Aspergillus urmiensis Aspergillus usamiiAspergillus ustilagoAspergillus ustus Aspergillus uvarum 

VAspergillus vadensis Aspergillus vancampenhoutiiAspergillus vandermerwei Aspergillus varanasensisAspergillus variabilisAspergillus varians Aspergillus variecolorAspergillus variegatusAspergillus velutinusAspergillus venenatus Aspergillus venezuelensis Aspergillus versicolor Aspergillus villosus Aspergillus vinaceus Aspergillus vinosobubalinus Aspergillus violaceobrunneus Aspergillus violaceofuscus Aspergillus violaceus Aspergillus virensAspergillus viridicatenatus Aspergillus viridigriseusAspergillus viridinutans Aspergillus vitellinus Aspergillus vitis Aspergillus vitricolaWAspergillus waksmanii    Aspergillus wangduanlii Aspergillus warcupii Aspergillus waynelawii Aspergillus wehmeriAspergillus welwitschiae Aspergillus wentii Aspergillus westendorpiiAspergillus westlandensis Aspergillus westerdijkiae Aspergillus westlandensis Aspergillus whitfieldii Aspergillus wisconsinensis Aspergillus wyomingensis   

XAspergillus xerophilus Aspergillus xishaensis 

YAspergillus yezoensisAspergillus yunnanensis 

ZAspergillus zhaoqingensis Aspergillus zonatusAspergillus zutongqii''

References 

Aspergillus
Aspergillus, List
Aspergillus, List